Santiago Bernabéu may refer to:

 Santiago Bernabéu (footballer) (1895–1978), former Real Madrid footballer and president
 Santiago Bernabéu Stadium, the football stadium in Madrid of Real Madrid CF named after the above
 Trofeo Santiago Bernabéu, a Spanish football summer trophy named after the above
 Santiago Bernabéu (Madrid Metro), a metro station outside the Santiago Bernabéu Stadium